Res Gestae is Latin term meaning "things done", and may refer to:
Res gestae, a legal term in American jurisprudence and English law

The term appears in titles of works recording the accomplishments of certain people, including:
Res Gestae Divi Augusti, the funerary inscription of the Roman emperor Augustus
Various other "Res Gestae" inscriptions scattered across the former Roman Empire
Res Gestae Divi Saporis, a name given by some Western scholars to the Shapur I's inscription at the Ka'ba-ye Zartosht
"Res gestae of Darius", sometimes used to refer to the Behistun Inscription
Res gestae Saxonicae sive annalium libri tres, or The Deeds of the Saxons
Res gestae Alexandri Macedonis or Res gestae Alexandri Magni, a work translated by Julius Valerius Alexander Polemius

Latin words and phrases